The teams competing in Group 5 of the 2002 UEFA European Under-21 Championship qualifying competition were Norway, Ukraine, Poland, Wales, Belarus and Armenia.

Standings

Matches
All times are CET.

Goalscorers
 TBD

External links
 Group 5 at UEFA.com

Group 5